Rhopaloscelis unifasciatus is a species of beetle in the family Cerambycidae. It was described by Blessig in 1873. It is known from Mongolia, Russia, China, Japan, North Korea, and Kazakhstan.

References

Desmiphorini
Beetles described in 1873